York Region Transit Mobility Plus is a program that offers transit services, known as Mobility Plus, to the disabled using specially equipped buses. Mobility Plus is York Region's equivalent of the Toronto Transit Commission's Wheel-Trans service.

History
YRT Mobility Plus was created in 2001 following the merger of the various transit agencies in York Region. Most of the mobility system was inherited from Vaughan Transit and Markham Transit (Mobility Bus and Taxi Scrip), who operated similar systems since the 1980s.

Services
YRT Mobility Plus operates in a similar manner to Wheel-Trans and makes connections to other operators in Toronto, GO Transit, Mississauga Transit, Brampton Transit, and Durham Region Transit.

Fixed routes are the Community Bus routes, a concept borrowed from the Toronto Transit Commission's Wheel-Trans community routes:

 520/521 Newmarket Community Bus
 522 Markham Community Bus
 589/590 Richmond Hill Community Bus

York Region Mobility Bus can operate service to and within Toronto bounded by Toronto-Peel boundaries, Steeles Avenue West, Yonge Street and Highway 401. This is the case due to previous contract by Vaughan Transit.

Fleet
YRT Mobility Plus operates a mix of 60 different vehicles:

 Denotes wheelchair-accessible vehicles

YRT MP also contracts out services to taxi companies to operate car and minivan based services:

 Royal Taxi
 Mobility Transportation Services
 Scarborough City Cab

YRT MP also operates an unknown number of Toyota Camry or Chevrolet Impala in the fleet.

Together they provide 29 taxis and 19 minivans to the MP fleet. YRT leased 3 minivans to the contracts to complete the non-bus fleet.

See also
 WheelTrans
 Toronto Accessible Transit Services
 Transhelp

References

External links
Official Website

York Region Transit
Paratransit services in Canada